Theri may refer to:

Theri (film), a 2016 Indian Tamil film
Theri, honorific term in Pali for senior bhikkhunis (Buddhist nuns)